The second season of Undercover premiered on BNT 1 on November 20, 2011, and ended on February 5, 2012.

Plot
Popov finds out who is Dzharo's inside man, but the inside man is actually inside man of US Secret Service in Dzharo's group. Nikolov and Sunny are killed. Popov's and Dzharo's former college Mironov returns from the dead, Dzharo got a new sociate Anton Damyanov and Neshev replaced Nikolov.

Cast

Main
 Ivaylo Zahariev as Martin Hristov
 Irena Miliankova as Silvia Veleva - Sunny (episodes 1–9)
 Zahary Baharov as Ivo Andonov
 Vladimir Penev as Inspector Emil Popov
 Mihail Bilalov as Petar Tudzharov - Dzharo
 Hristo Mutafchiev as Alexander Mironov (episodes 1–11)
 Alexander Sano as Zdravko Kiselov - The Hair
 Deyan Donkov as Vasil Nikolov (episodes 1–4)
 Kiril Efremov as Tihomir Gardev - Tisho the Twin
 Ventsislav Yankov as Nikolay Rashev - Niki the Twin
 Tzvetana Maneva as Cveta Andonova (episodes 3–9)
 Petar Popyordanov as Momchil Neshev (episodes 5–12)
 Georgi Staykov as Anton Damyanov (episodes 3–12)
 Marian Valev as Rosen Gatzov - The Hook

Recurring
 Ivaylo Hristov as Kiril Hristov (episode 5)

Episodes

External links
 Pod Prikritie Official website
 Pod Prikritie Facebook
 New Films International: Undercover
 

Bulgarian television series
2011 Bulgarian television series debuts
2010s Bulgarian television series
2016 Bulgarian television series endings